Patricia Fortini Brown (born 16 November 1936) is Professor Emerita of Art & Archaeology at Princeton University. 

Venice and its empire, from the late middle ages through the early modern period, has been the primary site of her scholarly research, with a focus on how works of art and architecture can materialize and sum up significant aspects of the culture in which they were produced. Her recent work has focused on Venetian territories in the Mediterranean and the Terraferma, particularly the Friuli.

Life and career 
Brown was born and raised in Oakland, California, where she graduated from Fremont High School (1954).  After attending Brigham Young University, she graduated from the University of California, Berkeley, with an A.B. in Political Science (1959). Brown was active as a studio artist for 17 years and raised two sons before beginning graduate work. Returning to Berkeley in 1976, she earned an M.A. (1978) and PhD (1983) in the History of Art.  Brown taught at Princeton for 27 years (1983-2010), where she was the first woman to be promoted to tenure (1989) in the Department of Art & Archaeology and served as department chair for six years (1999 -2005).

Brown was Slade Professor of Fine Arts at the University of Cambridge (2000-2001). She served as president of the Renaissance Society of America (2000-2002), and was a member of the Board of Advisors for the Center for Advanced Study in the Visual Arts (2004-7). She serves on an Advisory committee for “Mediterranean Palimpsests: Connecting the Art and Architectural Histories of Medieval and Early Modern Cities," a Getty-funded research project (with research trips with the MCities group to Nicosia, Cordoba, Granada, Rhodes, and Thessaloniki), 2018-20, and has been a member of the Board of Trustees of Save Venice since 2004.

In recognition of her retirement in 2010, Brown was honored with eight sessions at the annual meeting of the Renaissance Society of America in Venice, as well as with a symposium at Princeton University: "Giorgione and His Times: Confronting Alternate Realities"  on the 500th anniversary of the death of Giorgione. Selected papers from the two symposia were published in a Festschrift edited by Blake de Maria and Mary E. Frank, Reflections on Renaissance Venice: a celebration of Patricia Fortini Brown (Milan: 5 Continents Editions; New York: Harry N. Abrams, 2013) (Winner of the Gladys Krieble Delmas Foundation Book Prize in 2015 from the Renaissance Society of America).

Honors and awards 

 1980: Social Science Research Council and American Council of Learned Societies International Doctoral Research Fellowship
 1980: Fulbright-Hays Grant for dissertation research in Italy
 1982, 1998: Gladys Krieble Delmas Foundation Grants for Research in Venice
 1989: Rome Prize Fellowship, American Academy in Rome
 1989: John Simon Guggenheim Fellowship
 1991-95: Andrew W. Mellon Professorship, Princeton University
 1992: Museo Italo Americano, San Francisco, Italian American Woman of the Year for scholarship in Italian Studies
 1998: Folger Shakespeare Library, Mellon Postdoctoral Research Fellowship
 2010: Ateneo Veneto di Scienze, Lettere ed Arti, elected Socio Straniero (Corresponding Fellow)
 2010: Stephen E. Ostrow Distinguished Visitor in the Visual Arts, Reed College
 2011: Serena Medal, awarded annually by the British Academy for ‘eminent services towards the furtherance of the study of Italian history, literature, art and economics’
 2014: Edward J. Olszewski Lecture in Italian Art, Case Western Reserve University
 2016: Sydney Freedberg Lecture in Italian Art, National Gallery of Art, Washington, DC
 2020: Renaissance Society of America, Paul Oscar Kristeller Lifetime Achievement Award

Selected publications
 Venetian Narrative Painting in the Age of Carpaccio (Yale University Press, 1988, 310 pp.). (Finalist, Premio "Salotto Veneto 89", for the best book published on Venetian culture)
 Le scuole (extract from Storia di Venezia, vol. 5, Italian Enciclopedia Treccani, translated by Luis Contarello, Roma : 1996)
 Venice & Antiquity: The Venetian Sense of the Past (Yale University Press, 1996, 361 pp.). (Winner of the Phyllis Goodhart Gordan Book Prize; (Finalist, Charles Rufus Morey Prize, College Art Association)
 Art and Life in Renaissance Venice (Harry N. Abrams, 1997, 176 pp.). (with French, German, Korean, Chinese, Spanish translations)
 Private Lives in Renaissance Venice: Art, Architecture, and the Family (Yale University Press, 2004, 312 pp.). (Finalist, Charles Rufus Morey Prize, College Art Association; Honorable Mention,Premio Salimbeni per La Storia e la Critica d’Arte)
Gabriele Matino and Patricia Fortini Brown, Carpaccio in Venice. A Guide (Venice: Marsilio Editori, 2020).; idem, Carpaccio a Venezia: Itinerari (Venezia: Marsilio Editori, 2020).
 The Venetian Bride: Bloodlines and Blood Feuds in Venice and its Empire (Oxford University Press, 2021, 448 pp.)

References

External links 
https://www.encyclopedia.com/arts/educational-magazines/brown-patricia-fortini-1936
https://princeton.academia.edu/PatriciaBrown
http://worldcat.org/identities/lccn-n86007475/
https://artandarchaeology.princeton.edu/people/faculty/patricia-fortini-brown
Ann Waldron, "From Artist to Art Historian'," Princeton Alumni Weekly, October 27, 1993, p. 5
Theo Panayides, "Venice scholar keeps youth on her side’, Cyprus-mail.com, April 25, 2017
The Aesthetics of Water: Wellheads, Cisterns, and Fountains in the Venetian Dominion,” The Sydney J. Freedberg Lecture on Italian Art, National Gallery of Art, November 6, 2016 
"From Carpaccio's "Saint Ursula" to Titian's "Lady in White": The Feminine Mystique in Renaissance Venice," Norton Simon Museum, Pasadena, February 9, 2019    
Save Venice July 2020 Newsletter: https://mailchi.mp/savevenice.org/julynews2020?e=9d436dd5f9

1936 births
Living people
People from Oakland, California
UC Berkeley College of Letters and Science alumni
Princeton University faculty
Women art historians
Slade Professors of Fine Art (University of Cambridge)
American Episcopalians
American women painters
Historians of the Renaissance
American art historians
American women academics
Historians from California
21st-century American women